Coleophora contrariella is a moth of the family Coleophoridae that is endemic to Canada, (Nova Scotia).

References

External links

contrariella
Moths of North America
Endemic fauna of Canada
Moths described in 1955
Taxa named by James Halliday McDunnough